
Malbork County is a unit of territorial administration and local government (powiat) in Pomeranian Voivodeship, northern Poland. It came into being on January 1, 1999, as a result of the Polish local government reforms passed in 1998. Until 2002, the county also included the areas which now make up Sztum County.

As of 2019, its total population is 63,575, out of which the population of Malbork is 38,464, of the urban-rural gmina of Nowy Staw is 4,248, and of the rural gminas is 20,862.

Malbork County on a map of the counties of Pomeranian Voivodeship

Malbork County is bordered by Nowy Dwór Gdański County to the north, Elbląg County to the east, Sztum County to the south, Tczew County to the west and Gdańsk County to the north-west.

Administrative division
The county is subdivided into six gminas (one urban, one urban-rural and four rural):

References

 
Malbork